Rodrigo Bonifácio da Rocha (born 4 December 1985), nicknamed Tiuí, is a Brazilian former footballer who played as a forward.

Football career
At Fluminense FC, Tiuí broke into the first team at the age of 18. In his first full season, he scored five goals in 18 Série A appearances, but only managed to find the net on three occasions the following campaign, having appeared in 29 league matches.

In 2006, Tiuí went on loan to Esporte Clube Noroeste from the Série C. He had another loan spell the same year with Santos FC, thus returning to the top level.

Tiuí signed with Sporting Clube de Portugal in January 2008, with the club buying half of the player's rights from C.A. Rentistas (his rights were in fact held by an investing company). His debut for the Lions came on 3 February in a 0–1 away loss to C.F. Os Belenenses; in one rare start, in the Portuguese classic against S.L. Benfica at home, he provided the assist in Simon Vukčević's goal as the derby finished 1–1 at the Estádio José Alvalade.

Tiuí scored his only Primeira Liga goal on 11 May 2008, against Boavista F.C. for the season's last matchday, with the 2–1 home win guaranteeing the second place and a direct qualifying position for the UEFA Champions League. A week later, he came from the bench at the beginning of extra time to net twice in the team's 2–0 final victory over FC Porto for the Taça de Portugal.

After an unassuming 2008–09 – only five matches in 79 minutes of play – Sporting exchanged 50% of its rights on Tiuí for the remaining 50% of Pedro Silva. On 20 September, the former signed a three-month contract with Clube Atlético Paranaense and, in January of the following year, the Uruguayans loaned him to Clube Atlético Goianiense; in August, he left for Russia's FC Terek Grozny in a 3+2 deal.

From then onwards, Tiuí competed in several levels of Brazilian football, with little impact. He also played in Japan, joining FC Gifu in early 2015 and switching to Fukushima United FC the following year.

Honours
Sporting
Taça de Portugal: 2007–08
Supertaça Cândido de Oliveira: 2008

Atlético Goianiense
Campeonato Goiano: 2010

References

External links
 
 
 

1985 births
Footballers from São Paulo (state)
Living people
Brazilian footballers
Association football forwards
Fluminense FC players
Esporte Clube Noroeste players
Santos FC players
Sporting CP footballers
Club Athletico Paranaense players
Atlético Clube Goianiense players
FC Akhmat Grozny players
Clube Náutico Capibaribe players
Criciúma Esporte Clube players
Brasiliense Futebol Clube players
Clube Atlético Linense players
Itumbiara Esporte Clube players
FC Gifu players
Fukushima United FC players
River Atlético Clube players
Uberaba Sport Club players
Campeonato Brasileiro Série A players
Campeonato Brasileiro Série B players
Campeonato Brasileiro Série C players
Primeira Liga players
Russian Premier League players
J2 League players
J3 League players
Brazilian expatriate footballers
Expatriate footballers in Portugal
Brazilian expatriate sportspeople in Portugal
Expatriate footballers in Russia
Brazilian expatriate sportspeople in Russia
Expatriate footballers in Japan
Brazilian expatriate sportspeople in Japan
People from Taboão da Serra